Raili Tuominen-Hämäläinen (13 October 1932 – 18 March 2014) was a Finnish gymnast. She competed at the 1952 Summer Olympics and the 1960 Summer Olympics.

References

1932 births
2014 deaths
Finnish female artistic gymnasts
Olympic gymnasts of Finland
Gymnasts at the 1952 Summer Olympics
Gymnasts at the 1960 Summer Olympics
Gymnasts from Tampere
20th-century Finnish women